Mahendra Gaur is an Indian lawyer.

Early life

Mahendra Gaur born on 26 January 1956 at Nasirabad (Ajmer) spent his early years in Jodhpur, Jaipur, Udaipur for education. In 1967 he was selected for National Merit Scholarship and sponsored to Vidya Bhawan Public School, Udaipur for schooling. In 1971 he enrolled for engineering in Malaviya Regional Engineering College (now Malaviya National Institute of Technology) and graduated in 1976 with a degree in Mechanical Engineering.

Career

Mahendra Gaur joined Indian Oil Corporation Limited in February 1977. He underwent one-year training on "Utilization of Fuels and Lubricants in I. C. Engines and Industrial Machinery at Indian Institution of Petroleum, Dehradun as sponsored candidate from Indian Oil. He worked as Lubricant Technologist at Mumbai, Bhopal, Rajkot, Ahemdabad offices of Indian Oil. In 1989, he was sponsored by Indian Oil and Department of Personnel and Training, Government of India to National Management Program conducted by Management Development Institute, Gurgaon. The National Management Program was brainchild of Rajiv Gandhi and coordinated by P. Chidambaram. The National Management Program was supported by the three Indian Institute of Management, Ahemdabad, Banguluru, and Kolkata and XLRI Jamshedpur. On successful completion of NMP, he was awarded PGDM at a convocation ceremony attended by Manmohan Singh as chief guest.

Malpractices in Sale of 2T Oil

In 1993, while working for Indian Oil at Jaipur he discovered that two-wheeler owners were cheated by petrol pump dealers in the name of "single oil" and "double oil". The recommended dosage of 2T Oil in two-wheeler is 20ml/liter of Petrol, but the petrol pump dealers used to charge for 30 ml in the name of single oil but actually deliver 20 ml to the vehicle owners. Likewise in the name of "double oil" the consumer was given 40 ml, but charged for 60 ml. Mahendra Gaur fought a prolonged battle within Indian Oil, with the State Government of Rajasthan, Government of India to get relief to the two- and three-wheeler consumers.

Fake PUC Certificates

He also forced the Government Departments particularly Transport Department to deal firmly with the Petrol Pump Dealers who were issuing Fake PUC Certificates. In 2001 on his complaint the State Government initiated an inquiry which revealed that 80,000 Fake Pollution Under Control Certificates were issued. The transport commissioner cancelled licences of 5-dealers and Indian Oil fined Rs. 5000.00 each on the dealers and suspended licence for 15 days.

Right to Information

The Government of India introduced the Right to Information Act, 2005. Mahendra Gaur was among the first applicants who seriously went into pursuit of information under the Act. There was general reluctance among the Government Officers to give File Noting. He vociferously argued in favour of disclosure of file noting. He was one of the first applicants to get file noting from Cabinet Secretariat. In June 2006 he succeeded in compelling the Central Information Commission to issue directives to Department of Personnel to remove offensive information about file noting from its web site. Mahendra Gaur was the first person to get file noting from Government Department in Rajasthan. Mahendra Gaur has been in the forefront in getting the Right to Information Act, 2005 implemented in Delhi High Court, Rajasthan High Court and Bar Council of Rajasthan and the office of President of India

Legal Practice

In 2009, Bar Council of Rajasthan enrolled Mahendra Gaur as Advocate. He combines rare combination of Engineering and Management into Legal Profession. In 2009 when no one after Jaipur Indian Fire was ready to take up cudgels with the Government, he lodged FIR against Indian Oil and the Police Officers responsible for delay in investigating the criminal angle against Jaipur Fire. Mahendra Gaur represented widows of Indian Oil Fire in their quest for just and fair compensation and justice for their slain husbands. He is presently on a mission to introduce judicial reforms in Rajasthan High Court.

Rajasthan High Court

Rajasthan High Court had a poor record of implementing Right to Information Act and using Internet. Through a sustained campaign Mahendra Gaur introduced fundamental changes in the working of Rajasthan High Court. Mahendra Gaur compelled Rajasthan High Court to frame Rules and upload it on Internet. In the matter of 2009 Jaipur fire Mahendra Gaur has been appointed counsel by the Rajasthan State Legal Services Authority to represent the widows of Indian Oil Officers and other victims who lost their husband in the Fire Tragedy.

Public-Interest Litigation

In 2012–13, Mahendra Gaur has filed 7 public-interest litigation (PIL, or जनहित याचिका) in Rajasthan High Court concerning (a) Special Bench to hear and fast track cases related to Corruption, (b) Conflict of Interest of Judges posted in the same High Court where they previously practised as Advocates, (c) Filling up vacancies of Medical Teachers in Government Medical Colleges, (d) Against Dual Pricing of Petroleum Products, (e) Implementation of RTI Act, in Rajasthan High Court, (f) Installation of CCTV in Courts, and (g) Strict compliance of Roster Rules and Guidelines.

References

External links
 India Today – 
 CIC File Noting – 
 Times of India RTI – 
 CBI-CIC – 
 CIC – Price Rise 
 DNA – Widow's Case 
 DNA -IOC Case 
 Hindustan Times 
 The Tribune 
 Daily News 
 Rajasthan High Court 
 Rajasthan Patrika 

20th-century Indian lawyers
Living people
People from Ajmer
1956 births